Tottenham/Ronan Aerodrome  is located  northwest of Tottenham, Ontario, Canada.

Great Lakes Gliding Club is based at the aerodrome, and gliders are the predominant air traffic.

References

External links
 Great Lakes Gliding Club

Registered aerodromes in Ontario
Gliderports in Canada